Granat is the surname of the following people
Amy Granat (born 1976), American artist
Adrian Granat (born 1991), Swedish boxer
Balázs Granát (born 1985), Hungarian football player
Cary Granat, American entertainer and film producer 
Endre Granat (born 1937), American violinist
Erik Granat (born 1995), Swedish football player 
Jiří Granát (born 1955), Czech tennis player 
Vladimir Granat (born 1987), Russian football player 
Peter Granat (born 1954, murdered 2010), South African businessman. CEO Autozone, MD Supergroup